Wileman is a surname. Notable people with the surname include:

Chase Wileman (born 1986), American soccer player 
Heneage Wileman (1888–1926), British football player
Jonathan Wileman (born 1970), British cricketer
Margaret Wileman (1908–2014), British academic administrator and educator
Melissa Wileman (born 1972), New Zealand football player 
Seb Wileman (born 1993), Australian rugby union player 
Sid Wileman (1910–1985), British footballer

See also
Shelley Potteries